Saynab Qayad is a Somali politician, and was a member of the Transitional Federal Parliament. She was the chair of the Parliament's commission on human rights. Saynab was staying at the Muna Hotel in Mogadishu when it was attacked by Islamist militants in 2010.

References

Living people
Members of the Transitional Federal Parliament
21st-century Somalian women politicians
21st-century Somalian politicians
Year of birth missing (living people)